The Lightning Field (1977) is a land art work in Catron County, New Mexico, by sculptor Walter De Maria. It consists of 400 stainless steel poles with solid, pointed tips, arranged in a rectangular 1 mile × 1 kilometre grid array. It is maintained by the Dia Art Foundation as one of 11 locations and sites they manage. While the work's title, form and best-known photographs may suggest the installation attracts lightning strikes, in fact these happen rarely.

History
The work was commissioned by Dia Art Foundation, which now maintains it. De Maria and his assistants Robert Fosdick and Helen Winkler traveled around California, Nevada, Utah, Arizona and Texas by truck for over five years before settling on this site for the large installation.

Set in the middle of an empty plateau about 40 miles from the nearest town, the work consists of 400 stainless steel poles arranged in the form of a grid. The grid measures 1 mile by 1 kilometer, and the poles are set 220 feet apart from one another. Because the land undulates slightly, the two-inch diameter poles were constructed to vary in height to create an upper plane apparently level to the ground regardless of terrain. The poles range in height from 15 feet to 26 feet 9 inches. The poles are several times higher than an average person, and the tops end up on a plane level parallel to the ground regardless of the terrain the pole was erected in. Each steel rod is set in its own concrete footing, three feet deep and one foot in diameter, buried one foot beneath the surface. They are designed to survive winds of up to  an hour.

Support for maintaining and operating The Lightning Field is provided in part by an endowment established by Ray A. Graham III and Lannan Foundation, which awarded a challenge grant in 1996. Financial support for the permanent preservation of the undeveloped grasslands surrounding the installation has been provided by Dia's Board of Trustees, the State of New Mexico, De Maria's assistant Helen Winkler Fosdick, and Gucci.

By 2012, the structure as a whole needed reinforcement. To scrape together additional funds of an estimated $400,000 to preserve Lightning Field, Larry Gagosian, whose gallery represents De Maria, and Miuccia Prada collaborated to lead the restoration effort. Work on the Lightning Field was to begin in early 2013, and the sculpture was to be reopened in June.

Representation in other media
A photograph of The Lightning Field was used as the cover image for Robert Hughes's 1997 book, American Visions: The Epic History of Art in America. The work featured prominently in the novel Blinded by the Light by Morgan Hunt. It may have influenced the imagery of author Cormac McCarthy's epilogue in his book Blood Meridian.

It is the subject of "Poles Apart" (2011), a New Yorker article by Geoff Dyer. David Ulin discusses the work as a narrative which "unfolds not as a fixed encounter but rather as something that gets inside us in a more sequential way." It inspired composer John Mackey's piece which he entitled "The Lightning Field".

Visiting
Open for six months of the year, the installation can be visited only by making advance reservations that include an overnight stay in the accommodations at the site. The site is a long drive from a scheduled meeting place in Quemado to a log cabin in the area. 

The installation is intended to be viewed in isolation or with a very small group of people. A cabin on the site was restored to accommodate up to six people for this purpose. It has two bathrooms, a kitchen, and a common room. Camping and photography at the site are not permitted.

See also
Utah monolith

References

External links
  Official website
Photo gallery by Walter De Maria

The Lightning Field, article & photos at Atlas Obscura

Buildings and structures in Catron County, New Mexico
Land art
1977 sculptures
Outdoor sculptures in New Mexico
Tourist attractions in Catron County, New Mexico
Steel sculptures in New Mexico